Alec Susino (born 24 May 1995) is an Italy international rugby league footballer who plays as a  for the Penrith Panthers in the NSW Cup.

He previously played for the Barrow Raiders and Featherstone Rovers in the Betfred Championship.

Background
Susino was born in Campbelltown, New South Wales, Australia. He is of Italian descent.

He played junior rugby league for the Marconi Mustangs.

Playing career

Club career
Susino came through the youth system at the Cronulla-Sutherland Sharks, playing in their NRL Under-20s team.

He played for the Mount Pritchard Mounties in the 2017 NSW Cup.

Susino played in 51 games, and scored 8 tries for the Barrow Raiders between 2018 and 2019.

He played for Featherstone Rovers in the 2020 RFL Championship, returning home early due to the coronavirus.

Susino returned to Australia, signing with the Penrith Panthers ahead of their 2021 NSW Cup season.

International career
Susino  made his international début for Italy in October 2017 against Malta.

In 2022 he was named in the Italy squad for the 2021 Rugby League World Cup.

References

External links
Penrith Panthers profile
Italy profile

1995 births
Living people
Australian rugby league players
Australian people of Italian descent
Barrow Raiders players
Featherstone Rovers players
Italy national rugby league team players
Italy national rugby league team captains
Rugby league props
Rugby league players from Sydney